Shangyuan is a town in Beipiao, in Liaoning province, China. , it has 11 villages under its administration.
Shangyuan Village
Chaoyangsi Village
Goukouzi Village
Wangdaoying Village
Sanjuxing Village
Tubaoying Village
Kaoshantun Village
Chaomidian Village
Xiaobeigou Village
Zhangbaotu Village
Madaigou Village

References

Township-level divisions of Liaoning
Beipiao